Gibbins is a surname. 

Notable people with the surname include:

David Gibbins (born 1962), underwater archaeologist and bestselling novelist
Henry de Beltgens Gibbins (1865–1907), popular historian of 19th century England
Joseph Gibbins (1888–1965), British trade unionist and Labour politician
Michael Gibbins (rugby league), English rugby league footballer of the 1970s and 1980s
Mike Gibbins (1949–2005), Welsh drummer in the band Badfinger
Roger Gibbins (born 1955), English former professional football player
Vivian Gibbins (1901–1979), English amateur footballer
Wes Gibbins, fictional character played by Alfred Enoch (List of How to Get Away with Murder characters)

See also
 Gibbings (surname)
 Gibbs
 Chris Gibbin, U.S. filmmaker